The Fawley branch line, also known as the Waterside line is a standard-gauge railway line to Fawley, in the English county of Hampshire. It is on the opposite side of Southampton Water from the city of Southampton itself, in an area known as Waterside. For 40 years a passenger service operated, but this was withdrawn with the exception of the occasional enthusiasts' railtour. The line serves the freight needs of  Marchwood Military Port, having also served the same function for Fawley Refinery until 2016.

A proposal exists to reopen the line with two stations at Marchwood & Hythe.

History 
Authorised in 1903, after some years of trying, the line was built under the Light Railways Act 1896 as the Totton, Hythe and Fawley Light Railway and opened on 20 July 1925. It begins at South West Main Line at Totton, west of Southampton, where -bound trains run parallel with the branch for  before curving away to the south.

The passenger service served Marchwood,Hythe, and Fawley. Between Hythe and Fawley there was a Hardley Halt which opened for workmen in 1958 and closed in 1965. Operated by steam trains, then the 'Hampshire' diesel-electric multiple units, the service was withdrawn on 14 February 1966.

At first, traffic was light but they subsequently expanded when the then largest oil refinery in Britain opened at Fawley in the 1920s. The line became part of the British Railways (Southern Region) following nationalisation in 1948. The line was then only used by freight from Marchwood Military Port and Fawley Refinery until 2016.

Reopening proposal
On 16 June 2009 the Association of Train Operating Companies announced it was looking into the reopening of the railway as far as Hythe, with a possibility of a further extension to Fawley if agreement could be reached with Esso, which owns the land where Fawley railway station once stood. The proposals were:
 Reopening of all former stations along the line.
 A new station in Totton called Totton West, sited just west of the junction with the main line.
 A new train service from Fawley or Hythe to Totton and on via Southampton Central, Southampton Airport Parkway, Eastleigh, Chandlers Ford and Romsey before returning to Southampton Central, Totton and Fawley or Hythe, also serving other intermediate stations.

It was envisaged that the railway link could be built over a five to 10 year period at a cost of around £3 million. The service would be operated by the then franchisee South West Trains using diesel multiple units (DMUs). If the scheme delivered a sufficient financial return, there would be a future possibility of electrification.  The service was planned to run half-hourly during peak times and hourly at other times.

On 8 November 2013 Councillor David Harrison of Totton South and Marchwood obtained a copy of the final GRIP 3 Study report and shared it via his website.  In the report it was stated that the service would be half-hourly, using DMUs calling at all stations between Hythe and Southampton, including a new station to be called Hounsdown (once planned to be called Totton West). A new passing loop would have to be installed at Hounsdown to allow passing of freight and passenger trains. Other upgrades would include AWS/TPWS and signalling. For reasons of security at the oil refinery, Fawley station would not be reopened as part of the scheme.  It has been pointed out that there are some possible drawbacks to this scheme. For example, if the Waterside line gets the green light, the subsidy from Hampshire County Council for the Southampton & Hythe ferry service would be likely to cease, and the local bus companies which operate in the area might be at risk of losing some of their subsidy. 
On 21 January 2014 Hampshire County Council decided to shelve the plans to reopen the line. The council's report came down against committing further funding for the scheme due to a perceived poor value for money business case, although it said the authority should review the position should local circumstances change.

The last train serving the refinery ran on 1 September 2016, after which trains would normally run only as far as Marchwood, although the occasional private hire train would travel the branch line as far as the gates at Fawley oil refinery.

Hampshire County Council announced in November 2017 that it would look again at running passenger service due to planned housing development alongside the Waterside and on the former Fawley power plant site.

In August 2018, it was revealed that plans to reopen the line had been resurrected as part of the redevelopment known as Fawley Waters. At Marchwood the journey time would take 12 minutes and the line would be . The new Fawley station would be called ‘Hythe & Fawley Parkway’. In November 2018 Hampshire County Council announced the removal of the Hythe Ferry subsidy, despite there being no progress on the proposed rail scheme.

On 5 February 2019, the branch line was identified as a priority for reopening to passenger use by Campaign for Better Transport.  Campaign for Better Transport went on to say that reopening the line would reduce air pollution and relieve pressure on congested roads adjacent to the New Forest National Park.

On 23 May 2020, the DfT announced that the Waterside Line had been shortlisted for further funding to investigate restoration of passenger services. This would see the reinstatement of  station and a new station at Hythe Town, a little further west of the previous station. The end of the  line would be unused, but a southern terminus, called Hythe and fawley Parkway, would open on the site of the  station.

On 28 July 2020, South Western Railway ran a 'fact-finding train' down the branch line, stopping at Marchwood, to demonstrate the branch line's potential. This service carried the station's first passengers in 54 years.

In February 2021, Hampshire County Council released an updated strategic outline business case.  In the report, 3 new proposed service patterns were put forward;
 1 train per hour (tph) running between Salisbury or Romsey and Hythe & Fawley Parkway
 1 tph running between Salisbury or Romsey and Hythe & Fawley Parkway, and 1 tph running between London Victoria and Hythe & Fawley Parkway
 3 tph running between Southampton and Hythe & Fawley Parkway

In the business case, it would see Marchwood station reopen, possibly with an up and down platform, and electrification of the line, though both depend on the service pattern chosen above.  Hythe station would be relocated north of the existing station between School Road and New Road, near Hythe Library and a new station called Hythe and Fawley Parkway, which would be located on the site of the former Hardley Halt.  A local bus shuttle would operate from Hythe & Fawley Parkway station to Fawley and the housing development on the former Fawley Power Plant site.  It also proposes that three level crossings would be replaced with overbridges to minimise traffic disruption in the local areas.

On 7 May 2021, South Western Railway ran another fact-finding train down the branch line, stopping at Marchwood, to further demonstrate the branch line's potential.

On 24 March 2022 Rail reported that Network Rail is taking forward the scheme to get the line reopened. The service that Network Rail is proposing is a 2 car Class 158/9, running every 30 minutes between Hythe and Southampton. The business case is due to be submitted towards the end of 2022 to the Department of Transport, with a prospect of getting a decision in early 2024 and passenger services starting in 2025 at the earliest.

A series of public consultations were held between Monday 8 August and Friday 9 September 2022 to hear views on reintroducing passenger services to the Waterside Line.  On 30 November, Network Rail reported that 84 per cent of people backed the proposal to reinstate the line for passenger service.

References

Further reading

External links 
 Line on navigable O.S. map

Rail transport in Hampshire
Railway lines opened in 1925
Railway lines in South East England